In baseball statistics, a putout (denoted by PO or fly out when appropriate) is given to a defensive player who records an out by tagging a runner with the ball when he is not touching a base, catching a batted or thrown ball and tagging a base to put out a batter or runner (a force out), catching a thrown ball and tagging a base to record an out on an appeal play, catching a third strike (a strikeout), catching a batted ball on the fly (a fly out), or being positioned closest to a runner called out for interference. The pitcher is the player who pitches the baseball from the pitcher's mound toward the catcher to begin each play, with the goal of retiring a batter, who attempts to either make contact with the pitched ball or draw a walk. The pitcher is often considered the most important player on the defensive side of the game, playing the most difficult and specialized position, and as such is regarded as being at the right end of the defensive spectrum. Pitchers play far less than players at other positions, generally appearing in only two or three games per week; only one pitcher in major league history has appeared in 100 games in a single season. There are many different types of pitchers, generally divided between starting pitchers and relief pitchers, which include the middle reliever, lefty specialist, setup man, and closer. In the scoring system used to record defensive plays, the pitcher is assigned the number 1.

Pitchers typically record putouts by catching line drives or pop-ups, or by covering first base on ground balls to the first baseman. On pop-ups, however, pitchers will often instead act as a defensive supervisor, evaluating the ball's arc and selecting which infielder should make the catch. Pitchers can also record a putout while covering home plate by tagging a runner attempting to score a run if the catcher is retrieving a wild pitch, passed ball, or errant throw. Because of the relative rarity of such plays, as well as their reduced playing time, pitchers record far fewer putouts than players at any other position; players at every other position have recorded between five and forty-three times as many putouts as the top pitcher. Only four pitchers in history – none since 1886 – have recorded 50 putouts in a season, a total which a first baseman might reach in a week.

Career putout totals for pitchers have generally risen with the increase in long careers, and the lengthening of the major league season in the early 1960s. The top 11 career leaders are all starting pitchers who have been active since 1962. Right-handed pitchers generally record more putouts due to their facing first base after the follow-through of their pitching motion; the top 24 leaders are all right-handed. Greg Maddux is the all-time leader in career putouts by a pitcher with 546; he is the only pitcher to record more than 400 career putouts.

Key

List

Stats updated through the 2022 season

Other Hall of Famers

Notes

References

External links

Major League Baseball statistics
Putouts as a pitcher